Gerbrand may refer to:
 Gerbrand (da) (fl. c. 1022-1030), Bishop of the Diocese of Roskilde, in Denmark 
 Gerbrand Adriaensz Bredero (1585-1618), Dutch writer 
 Gerbrand van den Eeckhout (1621-1674), Dutch painter 

Dutch masculine given names